Raphaël Lévy is a professional Magic: The Gathering player. He was inducted to the Magic: The Gathering Pro Tour Hall of Fame in November 2006. He is the first player to have been inducted while active on the Pro Tour. He is one of only six players to have won a Grand Prix on three different continents (the others being Shuhei Nakamura, Alex Shvartsman, Carlos Romão, Yuuya Watanabe, and Martin Juza). He's holding the second most lifetime Pro Points behind Shuhei Nakamura.

Career
Raphaël Lévy began his Pro Tour career in 1997 at Pro Tour Paris. A 130th-place finish meant he did not qualify for the next Pro Tour. After missing Pro Tour New York, he qualified for the 1997 World Championship, and did not miss a Pro Tour until Pro Tour Ixalan due to the birth of his child.

Lévy first began to attract attention the following season first by winning Grand Prix Lyon and then reaching the top eight of the World Championship. He was the only non-American in an impressive top eight whose players now have a combined 37 Pro Tour Sunday appearances.

In 1998-99, Lévy continued to perform well with fourth-place finishes in Grand Prix Barcelona and the European Championship in Berlin. Before the turn of the millennium, Lévy put up his second Pro Tour Top eight. A semifinal loss to Brian Davis saw Lévy put up yet another fourth-place finish.

Over the following six years, Lévy did well without standing out. He remained continuously qualified for the Pro Tour, and put up nine Grand Prix top eights. However, his third Pro Tour Top Eight would not come until seven years after his second. In 2006, Lévy's two Pro Tour Top Eights and streak of then 47 consecutive Pro Tours attended were enough to get him inducted into the Magic: The Gathering Hall of Fame. This honour served to reinvigorate Lévy's game. The following season, he won back to back Grand Prix in Dallas and Singapore. He made his third Pro Tour Top eight in Yokohama, making him the first Hall of Famer to make it back to the Sunday stage.

Since then, Lévy has returned to putting up solid Pro Tour finishes without reaching the top eight, and has put up five more Grand Prix top eights, one of which was his fourth Grand Prix title. 

In 2012, at Pro Tour Dark Ascension Lévy earned 6 pro points equalling the 500 lifetime pro points record of Kai Budde.  Raphael Levy also became the 2012 French National Champion by being the highest ranked French player after Pro Tour Avacyn Restored, and as a result was part of the French National Team at the inaugural 2012 World Magic Cup, where they finished in 10th place. Levy was in 2013 once again the highest ranking French player, and at the 2013 World Magic Cup he captained the French team to victory. The win qualified Levy for the 2014 World Championship, where he finished 17th.

During the 2015-2016 season, Lévy added two GP trophies (making it 6) to his résumé: one in Madison in Battle for Zendikar Limited  and the second one in Manchester in Standard.

In 2019, after racking up good results over the season, he qualified to both World Championship XXVI and the  MPL for the following seasons as one of the top 4 Challengers. 

While the pandemic shut down live tournament, Lévy reached the top 8 of three major tournaments: the Players Tour Finals (8th place), the Grand Finals (4th place) and the Strixhaven Championship (8th place).

Accomplishments

Top 8 appearances 

Other accomplishments
 Magic: The Gathering Hall of Fame class of 2006
 Most Lifetime Pro Points
 Most Pro Tour appearances (87 as of Pro Tour Magic Origins)

References

Living people
French Magic: The Gathering players
1981 births
Sportspeople from Toulouse